Mir Sadat, is an American author, military officer, professor, and former policy director on the National Security Council.

Early life and education
Sadat was born in Germany's former capital city of Bonn. His parents were born in Kabul, Afghanistan.

He emigrated from Germany to the United States in 1984 at the age of 9.

Sadat finished high school and higher education in southern California.

He has a PhD from Claremont Graduate University.

Career
In the U.S. Navy, Sadat's assignments included being a Naval Attache for the U.S. Department of Defense, Space Policy Strategist for the Chief of Naval Operations and a Space Operations Officer in the U.S. Tenth Fleet.

Sadat was a professor at the National Intelligence University in Washington, D.C., where he specialized in Space Policy, Afghanistan, Pakistan, and Iran issues.

Sadat served as a Director at the U.S. National Security Council and led the interagency coordination on defense and space policy issues.  During his time in the White House, the NSC oversaw the establishment of the U.S. Space Force and U.S. Space Command.

Sadat led multiple key projects with NASA to reduce U.S. risk and dependencies in the US Space Program on foreign nations who view America as an adversary.

While on the NSC, Sadat worked on an initiative to power space vehicles with modular nuclear reactors.He advanced space policies on supply chain, nuclear power, and strategic technical competition.

Along with co-author Bruce Cahan, Sadat authored U.S. Space Policy for the New Space Age: Competing on the Final Frontier, proposing policy changes to address economic aspects of American space policy.

In 2020, he founded The Space Force Journal which launched its for issue in January 2021.

References

Date of birth missing (living people)
Year of birth missing (living people)
Living people
United States Navy officers
American writers